UY Scuti is the twelfth studio album by Nigerian rapper Olamide, released on June 18, 2021. It follows his 2020 album Carpe Diem.

Background 
On March 16, 2021, via his Instagram story, Olamide announced he was done working on another album. He made public the name and release date for the new project on April 18. He released the track listing of the album which features Layydoe, Fave, Jaywillz and Phyno on June 9 via his Instagram page.

Track listing

Charts

Awards and nominations

References

2021 albums
Olamide albums